Heritage Action for America, more commonly known simply as Heritage Action, is a conservative policy advocacy organization founded in 2010. Heritage Action, which has affiliates throughout the United States, is a sister organization of the conservative think tank The Heritage Foundation. Heritage Action has been called a "powerhouse in a new generation of conservative groups" and "perhaps now the most influential lobby group among Congressional Republicans." Executive director Jessica Anderson has led the organization since April 2020.

Heritage Action launched a campaign in August 2013 to link stopping the Patient Protection and Affordable Care Act, also known as the ACA or "Obamacare", with laws to keep the federal government open or to increase the federal debt limit. The organization played an instrumental role in the government shutdown of October 2013.

Background and history
Heritage Action was first announced in April 2010 by Ed Feulner, the then president of The Heritage Foundation. He stated the purpose of the organization was to harness "grassroots energy to increase the pressure on Members of Congress to embrace The Heritage Foundation’s policy recommendations." He also said it would not be involved in election campaigns.
Heritage Action's goal was to expand the political reach of The Heritage Foundation and advance the policies recommended by its researchers.

The organization was launched primarily as a response to The Heritage Foundation's growing membership, and the fact that The Heritage Foundation is not allowed to back legislation due to its 501(c)(3) tax-exempt status. Heritage Action fulfills this role and provides a link between the think tank and grassroots conservative activists.

Heritage Action began with a staff of ten, including original chief executive officer Michael A. Needham and Timothy Chapman. Chapman become executive director in May 2018 following Needham's departure. Chapman had previously served as Heritage Action's chief operating officer and as chief of staff to Heritage Foundation President Ed J. Feulner. Chapman left the organization in March 2020.

Jessica Anderson has led the organization since 2020. Jessica Anderson first joined Heritage Action in 2010 and served as grassroots director, but left in 2017 to serve in the Office of Management and Budget in the Trump Administration. She returned to Heritage Action as vice president in 2018 before being named executive director in 2020.

Activities

Heritage Action launched its first advocacy campaign in July 2010, targeting Patient Protection and Affordable Care Act (PPACA), President Barack Obama's health care reform law. By August 2010 the organization had helped to secure 170 Republican co-sponsors for a petition by Rep. Steve King to force a vote on repealing the healthcare reform. Following this, in September 2010, the group began a 10-day television and web campaign to persuade Democrats to sign onto a repeal of the law. The group opened its state operations in North Carolina and Pennsylvania in January 2011, specifically to focus on mobilizing voters against the health care law.

Heritage Action launched a campaign in August 2013 to link the Patient Protection and Affordable Care Act, also known as the ACA or "Obamacare", with laws to keep the federal government open or to increase the federal debt limit. The organization played an instrumental role in the government shutdown of October 2013. During the shutdown  Heritage Action continued to urge lawmakers not to negotiate a measure to fully fund the government without dismantling the ACA. The strategy of Heritage Action in tying the ACA to the shutdown, according to then-CEO Michael Needham, was to make President Obama "feel pain" because of the shutdown. Senator Orrin Hatch criticized Heritage for warning legislators not to vote for the Senate budget compromise during the government shutdown.

The group is also known for their congressional scorecard, which scores members of Congress on "votes, co-sponsorships and other legislative activity."

Heritage Action maintains a grassroots presence outside of D.C., with professional grassroots coordinators who recruit and train conservative "Sentinel" activists. In 2020, Heritage Action's grassroots work included door-to-door issue canvassing in Iowa, North Carolina, Pennsylvania, and Wisconsin. Due to the coronavirus, some of these efforts were replaced for a time by phone calls. In August 2020, Heritage Action launched a pro-police pledge "for citizens, lawmakers and candidates to stand with [the] nation's law enforcement officers." Over 100 members of Congress signed the pledge. The pledge was accompanied by pro-police billboards by the group in New York City, Dallas, and Atlanta.

Following the 2020 presidential election, Heritage Action drafted and lobbied in favor of new election legislation as part of Republican efforts to tighten election laws. In a leaked video of a presentation to donors, executive director Jessica Anderson cited the example of Iowa, where "we did it quickly and we did it quietly...Little fanfare. Honestly, nobody even noticed. My team looked at each other and we're like, 'It can't be that easy'." As part of this effort, the group has maintained a database of 1,322 "proven instances of voter fraud," though it dates to the mid-1980s but contained only one instance from the 2020 election, and included cases of fraudulent voter registration rather than voting.

In 2021 it was reported that, according to an internal document of the group's politics arm Heritage Action for America, a "two-year effort" was planned to work with like-minded groups to "produce model legislation for state legislatures to adopt" and to hire lobbyists in "crucial states". Heritage Action published a report in 2021 listing goals including limiting who can vote by mail, preventing ballot collection, banning drop boxes, enacting stricter voter identification laws, restricting early voting and providing greater access to partisan election observers.

Funding

Heritage Action is supported by individual and corporate donors, with its 2012 tax return indicating that 44 percent of its overall contributions came from donations of $5,000 or less that year. Heritage Action generally does not disclose its donors, but in 2013 confirmed a $500,000 donation made by the Koch brothers.

References

External links

The Heritage Foundation
Political advocacy groups in the United States
2010 establishments in the United States
Conservative organizations in the United States
Organizations established in 2010
501(c)(4) nonprofit organizations